Maria McAuley (née Fahy) and Maria Fahy Gilbert (1847 – September 19, 1919) was an American missioner who, along with her husband Jerry, founded the McAuley Water Street Mission (now the New York City Rescue Mission) to shelter the poor of New York City who were primarily immigrants. McAuley Mission became the first of over 300 rescue missions in the United States; together, these form the Association of Gospel Rescue Missions.

Background 
Maria Fahy was born in Ireland and immigrated to New York City. She became a prostitute or "fallen woman" according to some sources. Later, she said "she was a drunkard in a Cherry Street hovel, with only straw for a bed..." In 1865, Water Street missionaries converted her friend Jerry McAuley who was a convict, drunkard, and a "river thief." Fahy was interested in his new life, and was eventually also "rescued from a life of degradation." She married McAuley in 1872.

Mission 
Together, the McAuleys founded the McAuley Water Street Mission on Water Street in 1872. The purpose of the McAuley Mission was "to provide food, shelter, clothing and hope to people in crisis." In 1882, they opened the Jerry McAuley's Cremorne Mission at 104 West 32nd Street in Manhattan. The Cremorne Mission focused on helping women, especially prostitutes and other fallen women, turn their lives around.

After her husband died in 1884, she carried on their work, serving as matron or superintendent of the Cremorne Mission. The position paid $600 a year and came with an apartment over the mission. Perhaps due to managing the mission for eight years, her health began to fail and it was believed she would die in 1892. On April 1, she resigned from her position with the mission and moved to Cranford, New Jersey.

Later life 
On May 12, 1892, Maria married noted New York architect Bradford Lee Gilbert in Cranford, New Jersey. Gilbert was a long time supporter of Jerry McAuley's work and was a former trustee of the Cremorne Mission. The two had courted for five years, and Gilbert married her "when her health was poor and took care of her." 

Their marriage was the conclusion of a national scandal. In addition to their age difference—he was 38 and she was 55—he was married when they began courting. In 1887, Gilbert separated from his wife and filed for divorce in New Jersey. On October 13, 1887, Cora Gilbert served her husband with divorce papers during the intermission of a prayer meeting at Cremorne Mission based on infidelity. At the same time, she served Maria with a $50,000 lawsuit for alienation of affections, with allegations that "were numerous and specific."  

On October 16, 1887, at the Mission, Gilbert made a public announcement saying, "If it did not affect this mission and the noble Christian woman who conducts it, I would remain silent. I suppose you have all read in today's papers…a story reflecting upon Mrs. McAuley and myself. I pronounce it false. All those who know me will take my word, and all those who do not know me will see by the result that what I say is true." Standing by Gilbert and McAuley were banker A.S Hatch, real estate agent Sidney Whittemore, Franklin W. Coe, and other ladies and gentlemen associated with McAuley Mission. Hatch also spoke, saying "The very fact that I am on this platform tonight is sufficient for the purpose without saying a word, but I may add that my faith in Mrs. McAuley and Mr. Gilbert has not been shaken one jot by what has appeared in print, and I continue to have unwavering confidence in both." McAuley also spoke briefly and  "emphatically denied" the allegations.  In a few years, Gilbert obtained a divorce, and Cora Gilbert withdrew her lawsuit against McAuley.

Maria and Bradford Gilbert lived at 225 Park Place in New York City and had a summer home in Accord, New York. Neither continued an association with Cremorne Mission. They adopted their niece Blossom, daughter of Maria's sister. Gilbert died in 1911. In 1919, Maria Fahy Gilbert died in her home at 585 Park Place in Brooklyn, New York. Her funeral service was held at the Water Street Mission and she was buried at Woodlawn Cemetery.

References

1847 births
1919 deaths
American Protestant missionaries
Female Christian missionaries
Protestant missionaries in the United States